Ministry of Cooperatives and Rural Development is a ministry of Myanmar formed in 2021.The current union minister is Hla Moe, appointed by Min Aung Hlaing.

History
In Myanmar, the Ministry of Cooperatives and Commodity Distribution was established in 1951.Then, Ministry of Support and Cooperatives and Ministry of Cooperatives were reorganized.In 2016, Ministry of Cooperatives, Ministry of Livestock, Fisheries and Rural Development, Ministry of Agriculture and Irrigation were organized as Ministry of Agriculture, Livestocks and Irrigation.In the government formed after the military coup in 2021, the former Ministry of Cooperatives and the Department of Rural Development were reorganized as the Ministry of Cooperatives and Rural Development.

Ministers
Hla Moe (24 June 2021 - Incumbent)

deputy ministers
Myint Soe (4 April 2022 - Incumbent)

Departments
Department of Cooperatives
Co-operative University, Thanlyin
Co-operative University, Sagaing
Department of Rural Development ( https://www.drdmyanmar.org )
Department of Small-Scale Industries
Lacquerware Technology college (Bagan)
Saunders Weaving and Vocational Institute (Amarapura)
(8) Weaving and Vocational High Schools
(5) Basic weaving schools

References

CooperativesandRuralDevelopment
Myanmar
Myanmar